Mitopus morio is a species of harvestman belonging to the family Phalangiidae.

Distribution
This species occurs in Europe,  North Africa, Asia and in North America.

Habitat
This very common species inhabits different biotopes, forests, heath and moorland, spruce forests, beech forests. meadows, human settlements and gardens, from the lowlands to the mountains.

Description

However the body size is quite variable. The body is ovate, slightly narrower in the male. The head shows various tiny bumps. The eyes are small and narrow, longer than wider, with a varying number of small spikes around the eyebrow. Also color is rather variable, but males are usually brown-colored, where as females are darker. A dark irregular saddle-like area is always present on the back, sometimes with narrow white edges and a longitudinal pinkish stripe in the centre. The legs varies from yellowish-brown to dark brown and are thin and long. The length of the longest of the second pair of legs is 30-40 mm. Males have sharp, forward-pointing tooth under first segment of chelicera. 

This species is rather similar and may be confused with the females of Phalangium opilio.

Biology
Adults can be found from the middle of May until the middle of November, depending on the location. Eggs hatch at the end of March.  These harvestmen feed on small insects and other small arthropods. Mitopus morio has been observed to walk using its first, third, and fourth sets of legs, using the unusually long second pair of legs to feel in front of it and probe its environment.

Bibliography
Cawley, M.. 2002, A review of the Irish harvestmen (Arachnida: Opiliones), Bulletin Irish biogeographical Society, 26: 106-137 
Edgar, A. L., 1990. Opiliones (Phalangida). Pp. 529-581 in: D. L. Dindal, ed., Soil Biology Guide. John Wiley & Sons, New York, : i-xx, 1–1349.
Sankey, J.H.P & Savory, T.H. 1974, British Harvestmen. Arachnida : Opiliones, Synopses of the British Fauna, 4: 1-76

References

External links
  BioImages
 Invertebrated On Line

Harvestmen
Arachnids of Asia
Arachnids of Europe
Animals described in 1779